Mbarara–Ishaka Road is a road in the Western Region of Uganda, connecting the towns of Mbarara in Mbarara District with Ishaka in Bushenyi District.

Location
The coordinates of the road near Kabwohe are 0°34'46.0"S, 30°23'31.0"E (Latitude:-0.579453; Longitude:30.391942).

Overview
This road is a major transport corridor in the sub-region and for traffic from the sub-region to the urban centers of Mbarara and further east, Masaka and Kampala. This road was last renovated between September 1987 and December 1994, with loans from the World Bank.

See also
List of roads in Uganda

References

External links
 Uganda National Road Authority Homepage
 4). Project Completion Report - Rehabilitation the Ishaka-Katunguru Road, Uganda

Roads in Uganda
Bushenyi District
Sheema District
Mbarara District
Western Region, Uganda